Adam Francis Burdett (20 August 1882 – 4 November 1918) was a South African rugby union player from Oudtshoorn. He was killed in World War I, while serving as a captain in the South African Service Corps. He took part in the 1906–07 South Africa rugby union tour, the original 'Springbok' tour. He was awarded two caps in November 1906, one against  and one against . He played for Western Province. He was 5 feet 10 inches, and weighed 12 stone 9 pounds.

See also
 List of international rugby union players killed in action during the First World War

References

External links
 Commonwealth War Graves database
 Springbok Hall of Fame

White South African people
Rugby union forwards
South African rugby union players
South Africa international rugby union players
South African military personnel killed in World War I
South African military personnel of World War I
1882 births
1918 deaths
People from Oudtshoorn
Rugby union players from the Western Cape
Western Province (rugby union) players